is a Japanese figure skater. She is the 2020 NHK Trophy bronze medalist and finished fifth at the 2022 Four Continents Championships, winning a small bronze medal for her free skate. On the junior level, she is the 2020–21 Japanese junior national champion and the 2019 JGP Latvia bronze medalist.

Personal life 
Matsuike was born on October 10, 2004, in Nagoya. As of 2020, she is a student at Chukyo University's senior high school. Matsuike admires Mao Asada and training mate Mako Yamashita.

Career

Early career 
Matsuike began skating in 2012. She trains under Machiko Yamada and Mihoko Higuchi in her hometown of Nagoya.

Matsuike competed at the Japan Novice Championships twice, finishing 14th in 2016–17 and 11th in 2017–18. She moved up to juniors the following year, finishing eighth at the 2018–19 Japan Junior Championships.

2019–2020 season 
Matsuike made her junior international debut at 2019 JGP Latvia, winning the bronze medal behind Lee Hae-in and Daria Usacheva. She is the first Japanese lady to medal in her junior international debut since Rika Kihira in 2016–17. Matsuike was scheduled to compete at 2019 JGP Italy, but withdrew due to injury.

At the 2019–20 Japan Junior Championships in November, Matsuike was third in the short program but 14th in the free skate to fall to ninth overall. As a result, she did not qualify for the senior Championships and did not make the 2020 Winter Youth Olympics or the 2020 World Junior Championships teams.

2020–2021 season 
Due to the cancellation of the Junior Grand Prix, Matsuike opened her season on the domestic qualifying circuit. She won the Chubu Regionals and the Western Sectionals en route to the 2020–21 Japan Junior Championships title. Matsuike won by nearly ten points over Hana Yoshida and Mao Shimada. Her win would have qualified her for a spot on the 2021 World Junior Championships team, but the event was cancelled.

Matsuike made her senior international debut at the 2020 NHK Trophy, winning bronze behind Kaori Sakamoto and Wakaba Higuchi. She called the event "a real confidence booster" and "that it [was] an honor to be skating here at NHK Trophy, so [she] wanted to enjoy every moment." Matsuike aimed to further develop her skills after competing alongside the seniors, but her performance drew praise from international commentators, including Ted Barton.

Matsuike made her senior Japan Championships debut, placing seventh in the short program after a fall on a non-element but otherwise executing the program cleanly.  She was fourth in the free skate, receiving an under rotation on one jump and an edge call on her triple flip, and rose to fourth place overall. As a result of her placement, Matsuike was named first alternate for the 2021 World Championships team, pending her attainment of senior TES minimums.

2021–2022 season 
Matsuike was assigned as a host pick to the 2021 NHK Trophy, where she finished in sixth place. She had begun attempting a triple Axel in competition that season at Japanese domestic competitions, but due to recovery from injury, did not attempt one at NHK. She was eighth at the 2021 Rostelecom Cup, her second Grand Prix. She expressed "many regrets about both of my programs" but said that she was focused on increasing her technical difficulty in the future to compete with the top Russian skaters. 

At the 2021–22 Japan Championships, Matsuike placed seventh. She was named as third alternate for the Japanese Olympic team and assigned to compete at the 2022 Four Continents Championships. A poor short program left Matsuike in eighth place at Four Continents going in the free skate, after falling on a triple flip attempt and stepping out of her jump combination. She went on to skate a clean free skate, other than an edge call on the triple flip, placing third in that segment and winning a bronze small medal. She rose to sixth overall. Matsuike reflected on her season, saying she had had "a lot of regrets" about earlier events and the short program, but that "I was crying and really under pressure, but I was able to push myself, and today's performance was good." She expressed a hope of adding more difficult technical content in the following season. Matsuike finished the season at the International Challenge Cup, winning the gold medal.

2022–2023 season 
After placing eighth in the short program at the 2022 Skate America, Matsuike withdrew before the free skate due to illness. She then went on to compete at the 2022 Grand Prix de France, where she subsequently finished in seventh place. Matsuike came thirteenth at the 2022–23 Japan Championships.

Programs

Competitive highlights 
GP: Grand Prix; JGP: Junior Grand Prix

Detailed results 
Small medals for short and free programs awarded only at ISU Championships. ISU Personal bests highlighted in bold.

Senior results

Junior results

References

External links 
 

2004 births
Living people
Japanese female single skaters
Figure skaters from Nagoya